Polecat Creek is a  long 4th order tributary to the Deep River in Guilford and Randolph Counties, North Carolina.

Variant names
According to the Geographic Names Information System, it has also been known historically as:
Polecat River

Course
Polecat Creek rises on the south side of Greensboro, North Carolina in Guilford County and then flows south into Randolph County to join the Deep River in Worthville, North Carolina.

Watershed
Polecat Creek drains  of area, receives about 46.5 in/year of precipitation, and has a wetness index of 414.85 and is about 46% forested.

See also
List of rivers of North Carolina

References

Rivers of North Carolina
Rivers of Guilford County, North Carolina
Rivers of Randolph County, North Carolina